Thomas Hutton-Mills (14 November 1894, Accra  – 11 May 1959, London) was a lawyer, politician and diplomat in the Gold Coast and subsequently Ghana.

Biography
Thomas Hutton-Mills was the son of Thomas Hutton-Mills Sr., a prominent lawyer and politician in the Gold Coast. He was educated at King's Lynn and Cambridge University. Called to the Bar from the Inner Temple in 1921, he practiced law in the Gold Coast. An early member of Kwame Nkrumah's Convention People's Party, he was imprisoned with other party leaders in 1950 for his part in the boycotts and strikes of that year.

Elected as a member for Accra to the Legislative Assembly in the 1951 elections, Hutton-Mills became Minister for Commerce Industry and Mines, and then Minister of Health and Labour. In 1954 he was dropped from the Cabinet, and replaced by Imoru Egala. Becoming a diplomat, Hutton-Mills was a Deputy Commissioner in London for several years before being appointed Ghana's Ambassador to Liberia.

On his death at a London hospital in 1959, he was 63 years old.

He was a distant cousin of the late Ghanaian president John Atta Mills.

References

1894 births
1959 deaths
20th-century Ghanaian lawyers
Ambassadors of Ghana to Liberia
Alumni of the University of Cambridge
Ga-Adangbe people
Government ministers of Ghana
Bruce family of Ghana
Ghanaian MPs 1951–1954
Ghanaian people of Scottish descent